Malay may refer to:

Languages
 Malay language or Bahasa Melayu, a major Austronesian language spoken in Indonesia, Malaysia, Brunei and Singapore
 History of the Malay language, the Malay language from the 4th to the 14th century
 Indonesian language, the official form of the Malay language in Indonesia
 Malaysian Malay, the official form of the Malay language in Malaysia
 Malayic languages, a group of closely related languages in the Malay Archipelago
 Malay trade and creole languages, a set of pidgin languages throughout the Sumatra, Malay Peninsula and the entire Malay archipelago
 Brunei Malay, an unofficial national language of Brunei distinct from standard Malay
 Kedah Malay, a variety of the Malaya languages spoken in Malaysia and Thailand
 Sri Lanka Malay language, spoken by the Malay race minority in Sri Lanka
 Songkhla Malay, variety of Malay spoken in Songkhla province, Thailand

Race and ethnic groups 
 Malay race, a racial category used in the late 19th and early 20th century to describe Austronesian peoples
 Overseas Malays, people of Malay race ancestry living outside Malay archipelago home areas
 Cape Malays, a Malay race descent or community in South Africa
 Cocos Malays, the predominant ethnic group (Malay race descent) of the Cocos (Keeling) Islands, now part of Australia.
 Sri Lankan Malays, a Malay race descent or community in Sri Lanka 
 Malays (ethnic group), the ethnic group located primarily in the Malay peninsula, and parts of Sumatra and Borneo
 Bruneian Malay people, ethnic Malays in Brunei Darussalam
 Malaysian Malays, a constitutionally defined group of Muslim Malaysian citizens
 Malay Indonesian, ethnic Malays in Indonesia
 Malay Singaporeans, a broad ethnic group defined by the Singaporean government
 Riau Malays, ethnic Malays who inhabit the area of Riau and the Riau Islands
 Thai Malays, ethnic Malays in Thailand

People
 Malay (record producer) (born 1978), American music producer
 Jessi Malay (born 1986), American singer in No Secrets
 Malay Ghosh (born 1944), Indian statistician and Distinguished Professor at the University of Florida
 Malay Roy Choudhury (born 1939), Bengali poet and novelist who founded the "Hungryalist Movement" in the 1960s
 Malay Banerjee (born 1955), Indian former cricketer
 Malay Bhowmick (born 1956)
 Andrei Malay (born 1973)
 Charlie Malay (1879–1905), professional baseball player
 Joe Malay (1905–1989), American baseball player

Places
 Malay, Azerbaijan, a village in Azerbaijan
 Malay, Aklan, a municipality in the Philippines
 Malay, Saône-et-Loire, a commune in the Saône-et-Loire département of France
 Malay Archipelago, the group of islands located between mainland Southeast Asia and Australia
 Malay-le-Grand, a commune in the Yonne département of France
 Malay-le-Petit, a commune in the Yonne département of France
 Malay Peninsula, the geographic area containing Malaysia and Singapore, as well as parts of Myanmar (Burma) and Thailand
 Malay Sheykh-e Ginklik,  a village in Golestan Province, Iran
 Malay Town, the unofficial name for an area of Cairns in Australia

Nation-states
 Peninsular Malaysia, a group of nine states of Malaysia (all located in West Malaysia) which have hereditary rulers
 Malaysia, the modern country that encompasses most of the ancient Malay ethnic group states

Historical Kingdoms
 Melayu Kingdom, a 7th-century classical Southeast Asian kingdom in Sumatra, Indonesia

Animals
 Malay chicken, a breed of chicken originating in Asia
 Malayan tiger (Panthera tigris jacksoni), a subspecies of tiger from the Malay peninsula

Ships
 SS Malay, a Norwegian cargo ship in service from 1959 to 1961 and now known as SS Ambria
 USS Malay (SP-735), a United States Navy patrol vessel in commission from 1917 to 1919

Other uses
 Malay alphabet, the more common of the two alphabets used today to write the Malay language
 Malay cuisine, the cuisine of Malay people of Malaysia, Indonesia, Singapore, Brunei, Mindanao and Southern Thailand
 Malay Village, a museum in Geylang, Singapore
 Malay world, the Malay-speaking countries of Southeast Asia, or the homeland of the Austronesian people

See also 
 Malay grammar, the body of rules that describe the structure of expressions in the Malay language
 Malay Democrats of the Philippines, a political party of the Philippines
 Malay Falls, Nova Scotia, a community in Canada
 Malaysian (disambiguation)
 Malaya (disambiguation)
 Malays (disambiguation)
 Melee (disambiguation)
 

Language and nationality disambiguation pages